Silver Creek is a village in Merrick County, Nebraska, United States. The population was 362 at the 2010 census. It is part of the Grand Island, Nebraska Micropolitan Statistical Area.

History
Silver Creek was platted in 1866 when the Union Pacific Railroad was extended to that point. It was named from the Silver Creek nearby, which was noted for the clarity of its waters.

Geography
Silver Creek is located at  (41.316486, -97.665285).

Demographics

2010 census
As of the census of 2010, there were 362 people, 168 households, and 97 families residing in the village. The racial makeup of the village was 98.6% White, 0.3% Native American, and 1.1% from other races. Hispanic or Latino of any race were 3.6% of the population.

There were 168 households, of which 23.8% had children under the age of 18 living with them, 44.6% were married couples living together, 8.9% had a female householder with no husband present, 4.2% had a male householder with no wife present, and 42.3% were non-families. 35.7% of all households were made up of individuals, and 20.3% had someone living alone who was 65 years of age or older. The average household size was 2.15 and the average family size was 2.82.

The median age in the village was 47.5 years. 21.5% of residents were under the age of 18; 6.5% were between the ages of 18 and 24; 19.1% were from 25 to 44; 27.6% were from 45 to 64; and 25.4% were 65 years of age or older. The gender makeup of the village was 50.3% male and 49.7% female.

2000 census
As of the census of 2000, there were 441 people, 195 households, and 121 families residing in the village. The population density was 1,532.6 people per square mile (587.1/km). There were 206 housing units at an average density of 715.9 per square mile (274.3/km). The racial makeup of the village was 99.55% White, 0.23% African American, and 0.23% from two or more races. Hispanic or Latino of any race were 0.23% of the population.

There were 195 households, out of which 28.2% had children under the age of 18 living with them, 50.3% were married couples living together, 8.2% had a female householder with no husband present, and 37.9% were non-families. 32.3% of all households were made up of individuals, and 20.0% had someone living alone who was 65 years of age or older. The average household size was 2.26 and the average family size was 2.88.

In the village, the population was spread out, with 26.3% under the age of 18, 7.5% from 18 to 24, 22.4% from 25 to 44, 21.8% from 45 to 64, and 22.0% who were 65 years of age or older. The median age was 38 years. For every 100 females, there were 87.7 males. For every 100 females age 18 and over, there were 85.7 males.

As of 2000 the median income for a household in the village was $29,732, and the median income for a family was $39,375. Males had a median income of $29,125 versus $19,375 for females. The per capita income for the village was $13,584. About 7.1% of families and 11.2% of the population were below the poverty line, including 6.7% of those under age 18 and 17.2% of those age 65 or over.

References

Villages in Merrick County, Nebraska
Villages in Nebraska
Grand Island micropolitan area